is a classic arcade game compilation published by Namco Bandai Games. It was originally released for the Nintendo DS on September 18, 2007.

Overview 
Namco Museum DS features 8 (10 if both Super Xevious and the old version of Dig Dug II are counted) games originally published by Namco.

Games featured in Namco Museum DS 

 Galaxian (1979)
 Pac-Man (1980)
 Galaga (1982)
 Xevious (1983)
 Mappy (1983)
 Super Xevious (1984) (hidden from view initially)
 The Tower of Druaga (1984)
 Dig Dug II (1985) (Old version included which is hidden from view initially)
 Pac-Man Vs. (2003) (Original port)

Super Xevious is unlocked by toggling settings in the game's Hardcore Options menu. Additionally, the old version of Dig Dug II is present as well, titled Dig Dug II (Old).

The port of Pac-Man Vs. contains an entirely different soundtrack and supports DS Download Play, allowing multiple players to play Pac-Man Vs. without extra game cards. As with the original version on the GameCube, there is no single player mode.

All games support high score saves, for the first time on a Nintendo handheld.

The games have been slightly modified from their original versions. Each of the games originally suffered from bugs, but in this version they are fixed. However, the player is given the option to play a bug fixed mode of each game, or turn off the bug fixes and retain the original functionality of the game. The collection also features virtual DIP switch modes where the switches can be turned on and off using the stylus, although not nearly as many of the original switches are on it. A diagram is listed on the top screen showing the various switch positions and functions. Galaga, The Tower of Druaga, Xevious and Super Xevious feature a navigation mode that shows various hints and tips throughout the gameplay to assist the player.

There is also a music jukebox that allows the player to sample the original game tunes of the arcade games included, also including unused tunes and sound effects in this mode for the various games in this collection. This collection also includes the Japanese promotional material and dip switch boards for each game. The player chooses an item to view and then can use the stylus to move the picture around, zoom in and zoom out.

The player can also wirelessly send one of any of the arcade games to another Nintendo DS by selecting "Demo" on the main menu. The receiver gets the game from Download Play and can play the full game until the system is shut off, although the receiver's scores are not saved.

It was re-released as part of a "Dual Pack" bundle with the Nintendo DS version of Pac-Man World 3 in North America on October 30, 2012.

Reception
Namco Museum DS has received a metascore of 67 from Metacritic, indicating "mixed or average reviews".

Notes

References

Bandai Namco video game compilations
2007 video games
Nintendo DS games
Nintendo DS-only games
Namco games
Video games developed in Japan
Video games scored by Manabu Namiki